The deputy president of the Nigerian Senate is second highest-ranking member of the Senate of Nigeria, after the President of the Senate. The current deputy president is Obarisi Ovie Omo-Agege of the All Progressives Congress. The deputy president presides over the senate in the absence of the senate president. The deputy president is elected by a majority of the senate.

List of Deputy Senate Presidents

References

Deputy Speakers
Government of Nigeria
Senate (Nigeria)